Gia Kancheli (10 August 1935 – 2 October 2019) was a  Georgian composer. He was born in Tbilisi, Georgia but resided in Belgium.

After the dissolution of the Soviet Union in 1991, Kancheli lived first in Berlin, and from 1995 in Antwerp, where he became composer-in-residence for the Royal Flemish Philharmonic. He died in his home city of Tbilisi, aged 84.

Work
In his symphonies, Kancheli's musical language typically consists of slow scraps of minor-mode melody against long, subdued, anguished string discords. Rodion Shchedrin referred to Kancheli as "an ascetic with the temperament of a maximalist; a restrained Vesuvius".

Kancheli wrote seven symphonies, and what he termed a liturgy for viola and orchestra, called Mourned by the Wind. His Fourth Symphony received its American premiere, with the Philadelphia Orchestra under Yuri Temirkanov, in January 1978, not long before the cultural freeze in the United States against Soviet culture. Glasnost allowed Kancheli to regain exposure, and he began to receive frequent commissions, as well as performances within Europe and North America.

Championed internationally by Lera Auerbach, Dennis Russell Davies, Jansug Kakhidze, Gidon Kremer, Yuri Bashmet, Kim Kashkashian, Mstislav Rostropovich, and the Kronos Quartet, Kancheli saw world premieres of his works in Seattle, as well as with the New York Philharmonic under Kurt Masur. He continued to receive regular commissions. Recordings of his recent works are regularly released, notably on the ECM label.

His work Styx is written for solo viola, chorus and orchestra. It is a farewell to his friends Avet Terterian and Alfred Schnittke, whose names are sung by the choir at certain points.

For two decades, he served as the music director of the Rustaveli Theatre in Tbilisi. He composed an opera Music for the Living, in collaboration with Rustaveli director Robert Sturua, and in December 1999, the opera was restaged for the Deutsches National Theater in Weimar.

He wrote music for films such as Georgiy Daneliya's science fiction film Kin-dza-dza! (1986) and its 2013 animated remake.

Filmography 

 1964 – Children of the Sea
 1965 – Gold (Animated film)
 1967 – Melancholy Romance
 1968 – Extraordinary Exhibition
 1968 – Don't Grieve
 1970 – Competition
 1970 – Feola (short)
 1970 – The Jug (short)
 1971 – Neighbour
 1972 – When Almonds Blossomed
 1972 – White Stones (short)
 1972 – Gladiator (short)
 1973 – Record
 1974 – The Eccentrics (with Jansug Kakhidze)
 1974 – Captains
 1974 – Night Visit (with Revaz Lagidze)
 1974 – Magic Egg (animated film)
 1975 – Caucasian Prisoner
 1975 – Caucasian Romance
 1977 – Stepmother of Samanishvili (with Jansug Kakhidze)
 1977 – Mimino
 1977 – Cinema
 1978 – Some Interviews on Personal Matters
 1978 – Khanuma 
 1978 – Caucasian Story
 1979 – Dumas in Caucasia
 1979 – Ground of Ancestors
 1980 – Earth, This Is Your Son
 1983 – Blue Mountains
 1984 – Day Is Longer Than Night 
 1986 – Kin-dza-dza!
 1987 – King Lear
 1988 – Life of Don Quixote and Sancho Panza
 1990 – Oh, This Horrible TV
 1990 – Passport
 1998 – Silver Heads
 2004 – National Bomb
 2009 – Happiness
 2010 – Felicita
 2010 – After the Mountains
 2011 – The Tree of Life
 2012 – Ku! Kin-dza-dza (animated film)

Played in films 

 2001 – Giya Kancheli (Documentary)
 2011 – Giya Kancheli. Life in sounds (Documentary)
 2012 – Mimino - Secret Soviet movie (Documentary)
 2012 – Georgiy Daneliya (Documentary)
 2014 – Goodbye to Language
 2016 – Voyage of Time

Selected works

Early works
Concerto for Orchestra (1961)
Woodwind Quintet (1961)
Largo and Allegro (1963)
Symphony No. 1 (1967)

Orchestral
 Symphony No. 2 "Songs" (1970)
 Symphony No. 3 (1973)
 Symphony No. 4 "To the Memory of Michelangelo" (1974)
 Symphony No. 5 "To the Memory of My Parents" (1977)
 Symphony No. 6 (1978–1980)
 Symphony No. 7 "Epilogue" (1986)
Mourned by the Wind (Vom Winde beweint), liturgy for viola (or cello) and orchestra (1989)
Evening Prayers (Abendgebete) from "Life Without Christmas" (1991)
Abii ne viderem ("I turned away so as not to see") for alto flute / viola, piano and string orchestra (1992–1994)
Another Step... (Noch Einen Schritt...) (1992)
Wingless (1993)
Magnum Ignotum (1994)
Trauerfarbenes Land (1994)
Lament, Music of Mourning in Memory of Luigi Nono (1994)
Simi, "Joyless Thoughts", for cello and orchestra (1995)
...à la Duduki (1995)
V & V  (1995)
Valse Boston (1996)
Diplipito (1997)
Childhood Revisited (Besuch In Der Kindheit) (1998)
Sio (1998)
Rokwa (1999)
And Farewell Goes Out Sighing... (1999)
A Little Daneliade (2000)
...al Niente (2000)
Ergo (2000)
Don’t Grieve (2001)
Fingerprints (2002)
Lonesome – 2 great Slava from 2 GKs (2002)
Warzone (2002)
Twilight (2004)
Ex Contrario (2006)
Kapote (2006)
Silent Prayer (2007)
Broken Chant (2007)
Ilori  (2010)
Lingering for large orchestra (2012)
 Nu.Mu.Zu (I don't know, 2015), premiered by the National Orchestra of Belgium
Letters to Friends (2016)

Chamber music

Morning Prayers for chamber orchestra and tape (1990; 1st work from the 1990–95 four-part cycle A Life without Christmas)
Midday Prayers for soprano, clarinet and chamber orchestra (1990; 2nd work from the cycle A Life without Christmas)
Night Prayers for string quartet (1992–1995; 4th work from the cycle A Life without Christmas)
Caris Mere (After the wind) for soprano and viola (1994)
Magnum Ignotum for wind ensemble and tape (1994)
Valse Boston for piano and strings (1996)
Instead of a Tango for violin, bandoneon, piano and double bass (1996)
Time... and Again (1996)
In L'Istesso Tempo for piano quartet (1997)
Sio for strings, piano and percussion (1998)
Ninna Nanna for flute and string quartet (2008), commissioned by the National Flute Association
Chiaroscuro for string quartet (2011)
Woodwind Quintet for flute, oboe, clarinet, horn, bassoon (2013)

Choral/opera
Music for the living, opera in two acts (1982–1984)
Light Sorrow, music for orchestra, boys' choir and two boy sopranos (for the 40th anniversary of the victory over fascism) (1984)
Evening Prayers, for eight alto voices and chamber orchestra (1991; 3rd work from the 1990–95 four-part cycle A Life without Christmas)
Psalm 23, for soprano and chamber orchestra (1993)
Lament, concerto for violin, soprano and orchestra (1994)
Diplipito, for cello, counter-tenor and chamber orchestra (1997)
And Farewell Goes Out Sighing... for violin, countertenor and orchestra (1999)
Styx, for viola, mixed choir and orchestra (1999)
Little Imber (Kancheli), for solo voice, children's and men's choirs and small ensemble (2003)
Amao Omi, for SATB choir and saxophone quartet (2005)
Lulling the Sun, for six-part mixed choir and percussion (2008)
"Dixi", for mixed choir and orchestra (2009)

References

Sources
Kennedy, Michael (2006), The Oxford Dictionary of Music, 985 pages,

External links
 List of works 
 Entry at The Living Composers Project
 Music under Soviet Rule, by Ian McDonald
 Kancheli at Schirmer
 The Space of Absence in the Music of Giya Kancheli, by Dylan Trigg
 Giya Kancheli and the Aesthetics of Nostalgia, by Dylan Trigg
 Kancheli at ECM Records
 
Lulling the Sun, performed by the Shchedryk Children's Choir, Kiev (Marianna Sablina, director); via Deutsche Welle Radio, 26 September 2010

Interviews
Giya Kancheli interview, 27 February 1995

1935 births
2019 deaths
20th-century classical composers
20th-century male musicians
21st-century classical composers
21st-century male musicians
Burials at Didube Pantheon
Classical composers from Georgia (country)
Male film score composers
Male opera composers
Musicians from Tbilisi
Opera composers from Georgia (country)
Soviet classical composers
Soviet film score composers
Soviet male classical composers
Soviet opera composers
Tbilisi State Conservatoire alumni
Wolf Prize in Arts laureates